Craddock may refer to:

People
 Craddock (surname), a Welsh surname and a list of people with it
 Craddock Dufty (1900–1955), New Zealand rugby league player

Places
 Craddock, Alberta, Canada, a former unincorporated community
 Craddock, Missouri, United States, an unincorporated community
 Craddock, West Virginia, United States, an unincorporated community
 Craddock Massif, a mountain massif in the Sentinel Range, Ellsworth Mountains, Antarctica
 Mount Craddock, forming the south extremity of Craddock Massif
 Craddock Moor stone circle, a stone circle in Cornwall, England, United Kingdom

Other uses
 Mrs Craddock, a 1902 novel by William Somerset Maugham

See also
 Craddockville, Virginia, United States, an unincorporated community
 Cradock (disambiguation)
 Craddick (disambiguation)
 Cradick (disambiguation)
 Caradog (disambiguation)